Afghanistan is a country in South-Central Asia.

Afghanistan may also refer to:
 Islamic Republic of Afghanistan, a state that existed from 2004 to 2021 and is still recognized by the United Nations as the legitimate government of Afghanistan

Historical states 

 Democratic Republic of Afghanistan, a state that existed from 1978 to 1992. It was later renamed "Republic of Afghanistan" in 1987
 Islamic Emirate of Afghanistan (1996-2001)
 Islamic State of Afghanistan, a state that existed from 1992 to 2002
 Kingdom of Afghanistan, a kingdom that existed from 1926 to 1973
 Republic of Afghanistan (1973-1978)
 Transitional Islamic State of Afghanistan, a temporary administration of Afghanistan from 2002 to 2004

See also 
 
 
 Afghan (disambiguation)
 Afghani (disambiguation)